The following are events in 1876 which are relevant to the development of association football. Included are events in closely related codes, such as the Sheffield Rules.

Events
 Football Association of Wales is founded.

Clubs founded

England
 Accrington (note – this is the original Accrington club, not Accrington Stanley)
 Leek Town
 Middlesbrough
 Port Vale
 Stafford Rangers
 Stourbridge

Scotland
 Falkirk
 Partick Thistle

Domestic cups

Births
 4 January – Harry Johnson (d. 1940), England international half-back in six matches (1900–1903).
 20 January – Billy Williams (d. 1929), England international full-back in six matches (1897–1899).
 13 April – Bob McColl (d. 1959), Scotland international forward in thirteen matches (1896–1908), scoring thirteen goals.
 7 November – Alex Smith (d. 1954), Scotland international forward in twenty matches (1898–1911), scoring six goals.

References

 
Association football by year